Francisco Antonio "Tony" Figueroa Díaz (born 13 June 1999) is a Mexican professional footballer who plays as a winger for Liga MX club Pachuca.

International career
In April 2019, Figueroa was included in the 21-player squad to represent Mexico at the U-20 World Cup in Poland.

Career statistics

Club

Honours
Pachuca
CONCACAF Champions League: 2016–17

References 

1999 births
Living people
Association football wingers
Liga MX players
C.F. Pachuca players
People from Lázaro Cárdenas, Michoacán
Footballers from Michoacán
Mexican footballers